Marcus D. Boyd (born March 3, 1989) is an American sprinter, who specialises in the 400 meters. He ran for Baylor University.

Personal best

External links

Official bio at Baylor

1989 births
Living people
People from Fort Worth, Texas
American male sprinters
Baylor University alumni